This is a list of authors of Hindi literature, i.e. people who write in Hindi language, its dialects and Hindustani language.

A
 Amarkant (1925–2014), novelist
 Amar Goswami (1945–2012), Hindi author and journalist
 Amir Khusro (1253–1325 AD), author of pahelis and mukris in the "Hindavi" dialect
 Acharya Ramlochan Saran (1889–1971), author, grammarian and publisher
 Abid Surti (1935–), author
 Acharya Chatursen Shastri (1891–1960)
 Amrita Pritam (1919–2005)

B
 Bharatendu Harishchandra (1850–1885), the "father of modern Hindi literature"
 Bhadant Anand Kausalyayan (1905–1988)
 Bhisham Sahni (1915–2003), author
 Bhupendra Nath Kaushik (1924–2007), poet, writer, satirist
 Badri Narain Sinha (1930–1979), poet, critic, journalist
 Balendu Dwivedi (1975–), Hindi author
 Bihari (1595–1664), author of Satasai ("Seven Hundred Verses")
 Banarasidas (1586–1643), author of 'Ardhakathanaka', the first biography in Hindi
 Bhagwati Charan Verma (1903–1981), author of Chitralekha and Sahitya Akademy award winning Bhoole Bisre Chitra

C
 Chand Bardai (1148–1191), author of Prithviraj Raso
 Chitra Mudgal (1943–) The first Indian woman to receive the Vyas Samman for her novel "Aavaan".

D
 Darchhawna (1936–), Hindi writer and Padma Shri awardee
 Devaki Nandan Khatri (1861–1913), novelist, author of Chandrakanta
 Dharamvir Bharati (1926–1997), Hindi poet, playwright
 Dushyant Kumar (1931–1975), poet of modern Hindustani 
 Divya Prakash Dubey (1982–), Hindi author
 Doodhnath Singh (1936–2018), Hindi writer, critic, poet and a recipient of Bharat Bharti Samman

G
 Ganga Das (1823–1913), author of about fifty kavya-granthas and thousands of padas, he is known as Bhismpitama of the Hindi poetry.
 Geetanjali Shree (1957 - ) author of Tomb of Sand (Ret Samadhi) which won the International Booker Prize in 2022
 Gopal Singh Nepali (1911–1963), poet, lyricist
 Gajanan Madhav Muktibodh (1917–1964), modern Hindi poet
 Guru Bhakt Singh 'Bhakt' (1893–1983), "Wordsworth of India"
 Guru Gobind Singh Ji (1666–1708), the tenth Guru of Sikhism
 Babu Gulabrai (1888–1963), philosopher and Hindi writer
 Gopaldas Neeraj (1925–2018), poet and author
 Giriraj Kishore (1937–2020), writer

H
 Harishankar Parsai (1924–1995), satirist
 Hari Joshi (1943–), satirist, novelist, writer, poet
 Harivanshrai Bachchan (1907–2003): Madhushala
 Hrishikesh Sulabh (1955–)
 Hazari Prasad Dwivedi (1907–1979), novelist, literary historian

I
 Indira Dangi (1980–), novelist, writer

J
 Jagadguru Shree Kripaluji Maharaj (1922–2013)
 Jagadguru Swami Rambhadracharya (1950–)
 Jagdish Piyush (1950–2021), author, writer
 Jaishankar Prasad (1889–1937), poet known for Kamayani
 Jainendra Kumar (1905–1988), author, short story writer
 Janki Ballabh Shastri (1916–2011), poet, author

K
 Kabir (1440–1518), poet, figure of the Bhakti movement
 Kavi Bhushan (1613–1712), poet and scholar who mainly wrote in braj bhasha
 Kaka Kalelkar (1885–1961), Gandhian, social reformer, scholar
 Kamleshwar (1932–2007), author, screenwriter, 2003 Sahitya Akademi Award for Kitne Pakistan (2000)
 Kashinath Singh (1937–), novelist, short story writer, 2011 Sahitya Akademi Award for Rehan Par Ragghu (2008), author of Kashi Ka Assi etc.
 Kedarnath Agarwal (1911–2000), recipient of the Sahitya Akademi Award (1986) for Apurva (poetry collection)
 Kedarnath Singh (1934–2018), modern poet
 Keshavdas (1555–1625), Sanskrit scholar, Hindi poet, author of Rasik Priya
 Krishna Sobti (1925–), recipient of Sahitya Akademi Award for the novel Zindaginama
 Kamta Prasad Guru (1875–1947), grammar expert
 Kaifi Azmi (1919–2002)

L
 Lallu Lal (1763–1835), author and translator
 Laxmi Narayan Mishra (1903–1987), playwright

M
 Mirabai (1498–1546/1547), poet
 Malik Muhammad Jayasi (1477–1542), Avadhi poet; author of Padmawat
 Mahadevi Varma (1907–1987), poet, writer, recipient of the Jnanpith Award
 Maithili Sharan Gupt (1886–1964), modern Hindi poet; a pioneer of Khadi boli poetry; author of the epic Saket
 Makhanlal Chaturvedi (1889–1968), poet, playwright, journalist
 Mannu Bhandari (1931–), novelist
 Mohan Rakesh (1925–1972), a pioneer of the Nai Kahani ("New Story") literary movement
 Mahavir Prasad Dwivedi (1864–1938), writer, linguist, translator
 Manohar Shyam Joshi (1933–2006), journalist, screenwriter
 Mehrunnisa Parvez (1944–), Hindi novelist, short story writer and Padma Shri awardee
 Madhur Kapila (1942–), art critic, Hindi writer, recipient of the 2011 Sahitya Akademi Award for contribution to literature
 Mohan Rana (1964–), Hindi poet and philosopher
 Mridula Garg (1938–), short story writer and novelist

N
 Nagarjun (1911–2002), poet, biographer
 Naresh Mehta (1922–2000), one of the pioneers Nakenwad movement
 Nalin Vilochan Sharma (1916–1961), one of the pioneers Nakenwad movement
 Neelam Saxena Chandra (1969–), poet, fiction
 Nirmal Verma (1929–2005), novelist, translator
 Narendra Kohli (1940–2021), credited with reinventing the ancient form of epic writing in modern prose

P
 Pandit Narendra Sharma (1913–1989), poet, lyricist
 Phanishwar Nath 'Renu' (1921–1977), Hindi novelist
 Padma Sachdev (1940–), poet, novelist in Hindi and Dogri
 Pran Kumar Sharma (1938–), creator of Chacha Choudhary
 Premchand (1880–1936), modern Hindustani literature
 Parichay Das (1964–), writer and editor in contemporary Bhojpuri poetry
 Pankaj Prasun (1984–), writer and poet of Satire poetry

R
 Ram Ratan Bhatnagar (1914–1992), writer, literary critic
 Ramesh Chandra Jha (1928–1994), poet, novelist
 Raghuvir Sahay (1929–1990), poet, translator, short-story writer and journalist
 Rahi Masoom Raza (1927–1992), writer, lyricist
 Rajkamal Choudhary (1929–1967), poet, short story writer, novelist, critic
 Rahul Sankrityayan (1893–1963), the "father of Hindi travel literature"
 Ravidas (1398–1448), guru, songwriter
 Rajendra Mishra (1919–1979), Hindi author, critic
 Rajendra Yadav (1929–2013), pioneer of "Nayi Kahani" movement
 Rajinder Singh Bedi (1915–1984), writer, screenwriter
 Ramdhari Singh Dinkar (1908–1974), nationalist poet, essayist
Ramnarayan Yadavendu (1909–1951), writer, fictionist, essayist and social reformer
 Ram Vilas Sharma (1912–2000), literary critic
 Ramvriksh Benipuri (1899–1968), writer
 Rangeya Raghav (1923–1962), writer
 Raskhan (1533–1618), poet
 Rustam Singh (1955–), poet, philosopher, translator and editor
 Rabindranath Tagore (1861–1941), writer, poet, and musician

S
 Sahajanand Saraswati (1889–1950), writer, scholar
 Sachchidananda Vatsyayan (1911–1987) ("Agyeya"), recipient of the Sahitya Akademi Award, and Jnanpith Award
 Sarveshwar Dayal Saxena (1927–1983), recipient of the Sahitya Akademi Award, 1983
 Sharad Joshi (1931–1991), satirist, screenwriter
 Shekhar Joshi (1939–), Hindi author
 Acharya Shivpujan Sahay (1893–1963), writer of novels and prose
 Sri Lal Sukla (1925–2011), satirist
 Sumitranandan Pant (1900–1977), Hindi poet
 Surdas (1467–1583), composer
 Sūdan (1700–1753), author and poet 
 Shahnaz Fatmi (1949–), writer, scholar
 Shankar Dayal Singh (1937–1995)
 Yagyadutt Sharma (1916–1993), Hindi novelist, writer and poet
 Subhadra Kumari Chauhan (1904–1948), poet, songwriter
 Suryakant Tripathi 'Nirala' (1896–1961), poet and author
 Safdar Hashmi (1889–1954), author, street theatre, activist
 Shyam Narayan Pandey (1907–1991), Hindi poet
 Saadat Hassan Manto (1912–1955), Hindi author
 Surender Mohan Pathak (1940–), Hindi author
 Sudama Panday 'Dhoomil' (1936–1975), Hindi poet, recipient of 1979 Sahitya Akademi Award for Kal Sunana Mujhe

T
 Teji Grover (1955–), poet, fiction writer, translator and painter
 Tulsidas (1532–1623), author of Shrī Rāmcharitmānas

U
 Usha Priyamvada (1930–), novelist, short-story writer, translator

V
 Vidyapati (1352–1448), a prominent poet of Eastern dialects
 Vishnu Prabhakar (1912–2009), recipient of the Sahitya Akademi Award for the novel Ardhanarishvara
 Vibhuti Narain Rai (1951–), novelist
 Viveki Rai (1924–2016), novelist
 Vrindavan Lal Verma (1889–1969), historical novelist
 Vidya Niwas Mishra (1926–2005), scholar, journalist
 Vrind (1643–1723), Braj bhasha poet

Y
 Yashpal (1903–1976), novelist, author, Jhutha Sach (The False Truth, 1958–1960)

See also
 List of Hindi-language poets

References

Lists of writers by language
 
Hindi-language literature
Hindi language
Authors